IBM Building can refer to:

590 Madison Avenue, also known as the IBM Building, New York City (former worldwide headquarters)
1200 Fifth, also known as the IBM Building, Seattle
IBM Building, Honolulu
United Steelworkers Building in Pittsburgh, originally known as the IBM Building
330 North Wabash in Chicago, formerly known as IBM Plaza
IBM branch office in Cranford, New Jersey, by architect Victor Lundy

See also
1250 René-Lévesque, formerly IBM-Marathon Tower, a skyscraper in Montreal
IBM Tower, now One Atlantic Center, a skyscraper in Atlanta
IBM Towers, now Fuji Xerox Towers, a skyscraper in Singapore

IBM